The 1974 FIBA Europe Under-18 Championship was an international basketball  competition held in France in 1974.

Final standings

Team roster
Branko Skroče, Goran Križnar, Boško Bosiočić, Rajko Žižić, Dušan Župančić, Aleksandar Paternost, Mladen Mohorović, Mihovil Nakić, Andro Knego, Darko Fabulić, Zoran Gavrilović, and Ratko Radovanović.
Head coach: Bogdan Tanjević.

Awards

External links
FIBA Archive

Youth
FIBA
1974
FIBA U18 European Championship